Euzophera nigricantella is a species of snout moth in the genus Euzophera. It was described by Émile Louis Ragonot in 1887. It is found in North America in Louisiana, Texas, New Mexico, Arizona and Mexico.

References

Moths described in 1887
Phycitini
Moths of North America